The 2021–22 Sydney Sixers Women's season was the seventh in the team's history. Coached by Ben Sawyer and captained by Ellyse Perry, the Sixers were not scheduled to play any WBBL07 games in their home state of New South Wales due to ongoing border restrictions related to the COVID-19 pandemic. They finished the regular season on the bottom of the ladder, and recorded more losses than wins, for the first time in the league's initial seven editions. The Sixers also ended the tournament with six consecutive losses, mirroring their equal-longest losing streak which occurred at the beginning of WBBL01.

Squad 
Each 2021–22 squad was made up of 15 active players. Teams could sign up to five 'marquee players', with a maximum of three of those from overseas. Marquees were defined as any overseas player, or a local player who holds a Cricket Australia national contract at the start of the WBBL|07 signing period.

Personnel changes made ahead of the season included:

 South African marquee Marizanne Kapp departed the Sixers, signing with the Perth Scorchers.
 Sarah Aley departed the Sixers, retiring from cricket after WBBL|06.
 South African marquee Dane van Niekerk departed the Sixers, signing with the Adelaide Strikers.
 Indian marquees Shafali Verma and Radha Yadav signed with the Sixers, marking their first appearances in the league.
 Maitlan Brown signed with the Sixers, departing the Melbourne Renegades.
 Nicole Bolton signed with the Sixers, departing the Perth Scorchers.
 Maddy Darke departed the Sixers, signing with the Melbourne Stars.
 Lisa Griffith departed the Sixers, signing with the Perth Scorchers.
 Claire Moore signed as a replacement player after Hayley Silver-Holmes was ruled out of the tournament due to a hip injury.
 On 2 July 2021, the Sixers announced coach Ben Sawyer would not return for WBBL|07, having instead taken on a full-time assistant role for the Australian national women's team. However, on 27 July, it was revealed Cricket Australia agreed to allow Sawyer to coach the Sixers for a seventh and final season.

Squad details during the season included:
 After electing to spend the beginning of the tournament at home for family reasons, Erin Burns could not secure a government exemption to travel from New South Wales to any of the states hosting WBBL|07 matches (including Tasmania, South Australia and Queensland). Burns was consequently ruled out from participating in the entire season.

The table below lists the Sixers players and their key stats (including runs scored, batting strike rate, wickets taken, economy rate, catches and stumpings) for the season.

Ladder

Fixtures 
All times are local

Statistics and awards 

 Most runs: Ellyse Perry – 358 (11th in the league)
 Highest score in an innings: Alyssa Healy – 94* (57) vs Perth Scorchers, 31 October 2021
 Most wickets: Lauren Cheatle – 10 (equal 23rd in the league)
 Best bowling figures in an innings: Nicole Bolton – 3/11 (2 overs) vs Perth Scorchers, 31 October 2021
 Most catches (fielder): Ashleigh Gardner – 8 (equal 5th in the league)
 Player of the Match awards:
 Ashleigh Gardner, Alyssa Healy – 2 each
 Shafali Verma – 1
Sixers Most Valuable Player: Nicole Bolton

References 

2021–22 Women's Big Bash League season by team
Sydney Sixers (WBBL)